Ramendra Sundar Tribedi (22 August 1864 – 6 June 1919) was a renowned Bengali author. He is known for his works in Bengali poems, and stories. He is one of the most popular poets of India.

Life
Ramendra Sundar Tribedi was born at Kandi, Murshidabad in West Bengal on 22 August 1864. His father's name was Govindasundar and his mother's name was Chandra Kamini. 
From his childhood, Tribedi was a successful student. After obtaining his B.Sc. degree (coming first in the exams), he competed for the prestigious Premchand Roychand Scholarship with physics and chemistry as his subjects. He won the scholarship (1888). The examiners' report said:

"The candidate who took up Chemistry and Physics appears to be about the best student who has yet taken up these subjects for the examination and on this account deserves recognition."

Tribedi was a teacher at and, later, the principal of the Ripon College as well as Surendranath Law College of Kolkata.

Ramendra Sundar Trivedi died on 6 June 1919 at Kolkata in West Bengal.

Writing career
Ramendra Sundar was a polymath who wrote on a host of themes, including popular science and the philosophy of science. His first articles appeared in the periodical 'Navajiban'.

His contribution to the functioning and development of the Bangiya Sahitya Parishad is considered to be momentous.

In Bengal, Ramendra Sundar's fame rests mostly on his popular science essays. As a popular science writer, Ramendra's commitment seems to have been "to share with everyone else the fun, the delight and ecstasy of science (in Ramendra’s  case, the  themes and findings of modern western science).  This  could only be achieved by dissolving the alien terms and themes in an indigenous,  flexible, and comprehensible linguistic medium.  Thus, when creating scientific terms, Ramendra took care to select words which were sweet sounding and easily pronounced,  drew examples from mythology, folklore and local traditions…, cemented his prose with humour, lined his comments with mild irony and talked of the gravest things with his tongue in his cheek. In this witty, sly, sceptical, gay and eminently human vein, he dragged science, epistemology and philosophy into the midst of a Bengali adda and domesticated them on the couch of a bhadralok’s drawing room."

Books
Prakriti [Collected essays on philosophy ]
Jigmasa [Collected essays on science ]
Charit-Katha [Collected essays and lectures on few eminent personalities in Bengali literature]
Bichitra Prasanga
Bangalakshmir Bratakatha
Bangla Sahityer Itihas [Vol- Adhunik Jug, Page 111] By Dr. Debesh Kumar Acharya

Honours 
The Ramendra Sundar Tribedi Setu over the river Bhāgirathi-Hooghly is named after him. This bridge connects Baharampur and Khagraghat in Murshidabad district of West Bengal by NH 12 (previously NH 34).

References

External links
 
 Tribedi, Ramendra Sundar at the West Bengal Public Library Network

Ramendra Sundar Tribedi
Ramendra Sundar Tribedi
1864 births
1919 deaths
Indian writers
Indian male writers
20th-century Indian writers
20th-century Indian male writers
19th-century Indian male writers
19th-century Indian writers
Vangiya Sahitya Parishad
People from Murshidabad district
University of Calcutta alumni
Academic staff of the University of Calcutta
19th-century Indian essayists
20th-century Indian essayists
Scholars from Kolkata
Bengali Hindus
20th-century Bengalis
19th-century Bengalis
People from West Bengal
Bengali poets
Bengali-language science fiction writers
Indian science fiction writers
19th-century Bengali poets
20th-century Bengali poets